The 2006 Milwaukee Brewers season was the 37th season for the Brewers in Milwaukee, the  9th in the National League, and 38th overall. They finished the season in fourth place in the National League Central Division and did not make the playoffs.

Offseason
December 7, 2005: Lyle Overbay was traded by the Milwaukee Brewers with Ty Taubenheim to the Toronto Blue Jays for David Bush, Gabe Gross, and Zach Jackson.
January 6, 2006: Russell Branyan was released by the Milwaukee Brewers.

Regular season

Season standings

National League Central

Record vs. opponents

Notable transactions
July 28, 2006: Carlos Lee was traded by the Milwaukee Brewers with Nelson Cruz to the Texas Rangers for Laynce Nix, Kevin Mench, Francisco Cordero, and Julian Cordero (minors).
July 28, 2006: David Bell was traded by the Philadelphia Phillies to the Milwaukee Brewers for Wilfrido Laureano (minors).

Roster

Game log

|- bgcolor="bbffbb"
| 1 || April 3 || Pittsburgh Pirates || 5-2 || Lehr (1–0) || Torres (0–1) || Turnbow (1) || 45,023 || 1-0
|- bgcolor="bbffbb"
| 2 || April 4 || Pittsburgh Pirates || 7-5 || Capuano (1-0) || Santos (0-1) || Turnbow (2) || 15,515 || 2-0
|- bgcolor="bbffbb"
| 3 || April 5 || Pittsburgh Pirates || 3-2 || Wise (1-0) || Marte (0-1) || Turnbow (3) || 15,430 || 3-0
|- bgcolor="bbffbb"
| 4 || April 7 || Arizona Diamondbacks || 3-1 || Bush (1-0) || Ortiz (0-1) || Turnbow (4) || 25,737 || 4-0
|- bgcolor="bbffbb"
| 5 || April 8 || Arizona Diamondbacks || 5-4 || Kolb (1-0) || Vizcaíno (0-1) || || 29,226 || 5-0
|- bgcolor="ffbbbb"
| 6 || April 9 || Arizona Diamondbacks || 0-7 || Vargas (1-0) || Capuano (1-1) || || 28,115 || 5-1
|- bgcolor="ffbbbb"
| 7 || April 10 || @ St. Louis Cardinals || 4-6 || Mulder (1-0) || Ohka (0-1) || Isringhausen (3) || 41,936 || 5-2
|- bgcolor="ffbbbb"
| 8 || April 12 || @ St. Louis Cardinals || 3-5 || Marquis (2-0) || Bush (1-1) || || 40,648 || 5-3
|- bgcolor="bbffbb"
| 9 || April 13 || @ St. Louis Cardinals || 4-3  || de la Rosa (1-0) || Isringhausen (0-2) || Turnbow (5) || 40,222 || 6-3
|- bgcolor="ffbbbb"
| 10 || April 14 || @ New York Mets || 3-4 || Glavine (2-0) || Capuano (1-2)|| Wagner (3) || 37,489 || 6-4
|- bgcolor="bbffbb"
| 11 || April 15 || @ New York Mets || 8-2 || Ohka (1-1) || Trachsel (1-1) || || 55,830 || 7-4
|- bgcolor="ffbbbb"
| 12 || April 16 || @ New York Mets || 3-9 || Bannister (2-0) || Sheets (0-1) || || 38,119 || 7-5
|- bgcolor="ffbbbb"
| 13 || April 17 || @ Houston Astros || 7-8 || Astacio (1-0) || Wise (1-1) || Lidge (4) || 26,093 || 7-6
|- bgcolor="ffbbbb"
| 14 || April 18 || @ Houston Astros || 12-13 || Oswalt (3-0) || Davis (0-1) || Lidge (5) || 27,994 || 7-7
|- bgcolor="bbffbb"
| 15 || April 19 || @ Houston Astros || 7-2 || Capuano (2-2) || Pettitte (1-3) || || 27,002 || 8-7
|- bgcolor="ffbbbb"
| 16 || April 20 || Cincinnati Reds || 8-12 || Belisle (1-0) || Lehr (1-1) || || 15,347 || 8-8
|- bgcolor="ffbbbb"
| 17 || April 21 || Cincinnati Reds || 1-3 || Arroyo (3-0) || Sheets (0-2) || Weathers (4) || 29,825 || 8-9
|- bgcolor="bbffbb"
| 18 || April 22 || Cincinnati Reds || 11-0 || Bush (2-1) || Claussen (1-2) || || 35,768 || 9-9
|- bgcolor="ffbbbb"
| 19 || April 23 || Cincinnati Reds || 0-11 || Harang (3-1) || Davis (0-2) || || 29,174 || 9-10
|- bgcolor="bbffbb"
| 20 || April 24 || Atlanta Braves || 3-2 || Capuano (3-2) || Davies (1-2) || Turnbow (6) || 11,660 || 10-10
|- bgcolor="bbffbb"
| 21 || April 25 || Atlanta Braves || 4-2 || Ohka (2-1) || Hudson (1-2) || Turnbow (7) || 16,276 || 11-10
|- bgcolor="bbffbb"
| 22 || April 26 || Atlanta Braves || 5-4 || Sheets (1-2) || Sosa (0-4) || Turnbow (8) || 18,511 || 12-10
|- bgcolor="ffbbbb"
| 23 || April 28 || @ Chicago Cubs || 2-6 || Maddux (5-0) || Bush (2-2) || || 39,522 || 12-11
|- bgcolor="bbffbb"
| 24 || April 29 || @ Chicago Cubs || 16-2 || Davis (1-2) || Rusch (1-4) || || 40,644 || 13-11
|- bgcolor="bbffbb"
| 25 || April 30 || @ Chicago Cubs || 9-0 || Capuano (4-2) || Zambrano (0-2) || || 39,229 || 14-11

|- bgcolor="bbffbb"
| 26 || May 1 || Houston Astros || 4-2 || Wise (2-1) || Wheeler (0-1) || Turnbow (9) || 12,258 || 15-11
|- bgcolor="ffbbbb"
| 27 || May 2 || Houston Astros || 5-8 || Nieve (1-0) || Sheets (1-3) || Lidge (9) || 12,664 || 15-12
|- bgcolor="ffbbbb"
| 28 || May 3 || San Francisco || 0-2 || Schmidt (2-2) || Bush (2-3) || || 17,358 || 15-13
|- bgcolor="bbffbb"
| 29 || May 4 || San Francisco || 7-4 || Davis (2-2) || Hennessey (2-1) || Turnbow (10) || 21,038 || 16-13
|- bgcolor="ffbbbb"
| 30 || May 5 || @ Los Angeles Dodgers || 3-4 || Báez (1-1) || Wise (2-2) || || 47,731 || 16-14
|- bgcolor="ffbbbb"
| 31 || May 6 || @ Los Angeles Dodgers || 4-5 || Báez (1-2) || Demaria (0-1) || || 46,087 || 16-15
|- bgcolor="ffbbbb"
| 32 || May 7 || @ Los Angeles Dodgers || 2-10 || Sele (1-0) || Bush (2-4) || || 53,532 || 16-16
|- bgcolor="bbffbb"
| 33 || May 9 ||  @ San Diego Padres || 5-4  || Kolb (2-0) || Hoffman (0-1) || Turnbow (11) || 22,196 || 17-16
|- bgcolor="ffbbbb"
| 34 || May 10 || @ San Diego Padres || 0-3 || Park (2-1) || Capuano (4-3) || Hoffman (6) || 20,088 || 17-17
|- bgcolor="ffbbbb"
| 35 || May 11 || @ San Diego Padres || 5-8 || Peavy (3-3) || Hendrickson (0-1) || || 22,500 || 17-18
|- bgcolor="bbffbb"
| 36 || May 12 || New York Mets || 9-6 || Bush (3-4) || Lima (0-2) || Turnbow (12) || 26,362 || 18-18
|- bgcolor="ffbbbb"
| 37 || May 13 || New York Mets || 8-9 || Bradford (2-1) || Turnbow (0-1) || Wagner (8) || 45,150 || 18-19
|- bgcolor="bbffbb"
| 38 || May 14 || New York Mets || 6-5  || de la Rosa (2-0) || Bradford (2-2) || || 28,104 || 19-19
|- bgcolor="bbffbb"
| 39 || May 16 || Philadelphia Phillies || 3-2 || Turnbow (1-1) || Franklin (1-3) || || 14,592 || 20-19
|- bgcolor="bbffbb"
| 40 || May 17 || Philadelphia Phillies || 8-7 || Capellan (1-0) || Rhodes (0-1) || || 20,874 || 21-19
|- bgcolor="bbffbb"
| 41 || May 18 || Philadelphia Phillies || 5-4 || Lehr (2-1) || Ryan Madson (4-2) || Turnbow (13) || 27,419 || 22-19
|- bgcolor="ffbbbb"
| 42 || May 19 || Minnesota Twins || 1-7 || Liriano (2-0) || Davis (2-3) || || 28,462 || 22-20
|- bgcolor="ffbbbb"
| 43 || May 20 || Minnesota Twins || 10-16 || Baker (2-4) || Hendrickson (0-2) || || 43,422 || 22-21
|- bgcolor="bbffbb"
| 44 || May 21 || Minnesota Twins || 5-3 || Capuano (5-3) || Crain (0-2)  ||  Turnbow (14) || 35,180 || 23-21
|- bgcolor="ffbbbb"
| 45 || May 22 || @ Cincinnati Reds || 5-15 || Arroyo (6-2) || Bush (3-5) || || 16,567 || 23-22
|- bgcolor="ffbbbb"
| 46 || May 23 || @ Cincinnati Reds || 3-7 || Ramírez (2-3) || Eveland (0-1) || || 16,528 || 23-23
|- bgcolor="bbffbb"
| 47 || May 24 || @ Cincinnati Reds || 6-2 || Davis (3-3) || Claussen (3-5) || || 29,065 || 24-23
|- bgcolor="bbffbb"
| 48 || May 26 || @ Philadelphia Phillies || 6-5  || Turnbow (2-1) || Gordon (2-2) || Shouse (1) || 43,852 || 25-23
|- bgcolor="bbffbb"
| 49 || May 27 || @ Philadelphia Phillies || 9-6 || Wise (3-2) || Franklin (1-4) || Turnbow (15) || 32,089 || 26-23
|- bgcolor="ffbbbb"
| 50 || May 28 || @ Philadelphia Phillies || 2-6 || Madson (5-3) || Eveland (0-2) || || 35,674 || 26-24
|- bgcolor="ffbbbb"
| 51 || May 29 || @ Pittsburgh Pirates || 3-14 || Duke (3-6) || Davis (3-4) || || 17,561 || 26-25
|- bgcolor="ffbbbb"
| 52 || May 30 || @ Pittsburgh Pirates || 1-12 || Santos (3-5) || de la Rosa (2-1) || || 14,300 || 26-26
|- bgcolor="ffbbbb"
| 53 || May 31 || @ Pittsburgh Pirates || 1-6 || Snell (5-3) || Capuano (5-4) || || 15,434 || 26-27

|- bgcolor="ffbbbb"
| 54 || June 1 || @ Pittsburgh Pirates || 3-4 || Grabow (1-1) || Turnbow (2-2) || || 12,899 || 26-28
|- bgcolor="ffbbbb"
| 55 || June 2 || Washington Nationals || 4-10 || Ortiz (4-4) || Eveland (0-3) || || 21,476 || 26-29
|- bgcolor="ffbbbb"
| 56 || June 3 || Washington Nationals || 3-4 || Bray (1-0) || Turnbow (2-3) || Cordero (9) || 40,392 || 26-30
|- bgcolor="ffbbbb"
| 57 || June 4 || Washington Nationals || 4-8 || Armas (6-3) || de la Rosa (2-2) || || 21,608 || 26-31
|- bgcolor="bbffbb"
| 58 || June 5 || San Diego Padres || 5-2 || Capuano (6-4) || Hensley (4-4) || Turnbow (16) || 13,611 || 27-31
|- bgcolor="bbffbb"
| 59 || June 6 || San Diego Padres || 5-1 || Bush (4-5) || Peavy (4-6) || || 14,722 || 28-31
|- bgcolor="ffbbbb"
| 60 || June 7 || San Diego Padres || 5-6 || Cassidy (4-2) || Wise (3-3) || Hoffman (13) || 16,982 || 28-32
|- bgcolor="bbffbb"
| 61 || June 8 || San Diego Padres || 4-3  || Turnbow (3-3) || Cassidy (4-3) || || 20,510 || 29-32
|- bgcolor="ffbbbb"
| 62 || June 9 || St. Louis Cardinals || 6-10 || Hancock (2-2) || Winkelsas (0-1) || Isringhausen (19) || 24,490 || 29-33
|- bgcolor="bbffbb"
| 63 || June 10 || St. Louis Cardinals || 4-3 || Wise (4-3) || Flores (0-1) || Turnbow (17) || 36,981 || 30-33
|- bgcolor="ffbbbb"
| 64 || June 11 || St. Louis Cardinals || 5-7 || Hancock (3-2) || Bush (4-6) || Isringhausen (20) || 29,122 || 30-34
|- bgcolor="bbffbb"
| 65 || June 12 || @ Cincinnati Reds || 6-5 || Jackson (1-0) || Mercker (0-1) || Turnbow (18) || 19,279 || 31-34
|- bgcolor="bbffbb"
| 66 || June 13 || @ Cincinnati Reds || 6-4 || Davis (4-4) || Arroyo (8-3) || Turnbow (19) || 21,829 || 32-34
|- bgcolor="ffbbbb"
| 67 || June 14 || @ Cincinnati Reds || 0-3  || Hammond (1-1) || Kolb (2-1) || || 27,716 || 32-35
|- bgcolor="bbffbb"
| 68 || June 16 || Cleveland Indians || 6-4 || Capuano (7-4) || Sabathia (5-3) || Turnbow (20) || 33,178 || 33-35
|- bgcolor="bbffbb"
| 69 || June 17 || Cleveland Indians || 3-2 || Capellan (2-0) || Wickman (1-2) || || 42,069 || 34-35
|- bgcolor="bbffbb"
| 70 || June 18 || Cleveland Indians || 6-3 || Turnbow (4-3) || Betancourt (0-3) || || 43,391 || 35-35
|- bgcolor="ffbbbb"
| 71 || June 19 || Detroit Tigers || 1-3 || Bonderman (7-4) || Wise (4-4) || Jones (19) || 29,623 || 35-36
|- bgcolor="ffbbbb"
| 72 || June 20 || Detroit Tigers || 1-10 || Miner (3-1) || Helling (0-1) || || 33,119 || 35-37
|- bgcolor="bbffbb"
| 73 || June 21 || Detroit Tigers || 4-3 || Capuano (8-4) || Zumaya (3-1) || Turnbow (21) || 31,222 || 36-37
|- bgcolor="bbffbb"
| 74 || June 23 || @ Kansas City Royals || 7-2 || Bush (5-6) || Keppel (0-4) || || 18,112 || 37-37
|- bgcolor="ffbbbb"
| 75 || June 24 || @ Kansas City Royals || 5-6 || Duckworth (1-1) || Davis (4-5) || Burgos (12) || 20,464 || 37-38
|- bgcolor="ffbbbb"
| 76 || June 25 || @ Kansas City Royals || 0-6 || Redman (5-4) || Helling (0-2) || Gobble (1) || 14,726 || 37-39
|- bgcolor="bbffbb"
| 77 || June 26 || @ Chicago Cubs || 6-0 || Capuano (9-4) || Maddux (7-8) || || 39,698 || 38-39
|- bgcolor="bbffbb"
| 78 || June 27 || @ Chicago Cubs || 8-5 || Shouse (1-0) || Dempster (1-4) || Turnbow (22) || 39,399 || 39-39
|- bgcolor="ffbbbb"
| 79 || June 28 || @ Chicago Cubs || 3-6 || Howry (3-2) || Kolb (2-2) || Dempster (12) || 39,321 || 39-40
|- bgcolor="bbffbb"
| 80 || June 29 || @ Chicago Cubs || 5-4 || González (1-0) || Prior (0-3) || Turnbow (23) || 39,144 || 40-40
|- bgcolor="ffbbbb"
| 81 || June 30 || @ Minnesota Twins || 2-8 || Radke (7-7) || Villanueva (0-1) || || 28,412 || 40-41

|- bgcolor="ffbbbb"
| 82 || July 1 || @ Minnesota Twins || 7-10 || Rincón (3-0) || Turnbow (4-4) || Nathan (14) || 35,056 || 40-42
|- bgcolor="ffbbbb"
| 83 || July 2 || @ Minnesota Twins || 0-8 || Liriano (9-1) || Jackson (1-1) || || 35,466 || 40-43
|- bgcolor="bbffbb"
| 84 || July 3 || Cincinnati Reds || 8-7 || Wise (5-4) || Coffey (3-3) || || 31,353 || 41-43
|- bgcolor="bbffbb"
| 85 || July 4 || Cincinnati Reds || 5-2 || Davis (5-5) || Arroyo (9-5) || Shouse (2) || 39,280 || 42-43
|- bgcolor="bbffbb"
| 86 || July 5 || Cincinnati Reds || 6-5  || González (2-0) || Standridge (1-1) || || 19,651 || 43-43
|- bgcolor="bbffbb"
| 87 || July 6 || Chicago Cubs || 2-0 || Capuano (10-4) || Maddux (7-9) || || 37,326 || 44-43
|- bgcolor="ffbbbb"
| 88 || July 7 || Chicago Cubs || 2-7 || Zambano (8-3) || Jackson (1-2) || || 41,172 || 44-44
|- bgcolor="ffbbbb"
| 89 || July 8 || Chicago Cubs || 1-3 || Mármol (2-3) || Bush (5-7) || Dempster (14) || 42,268 || 44-45
|- bgcolor="ffbbbb"
| 90 || July 9 || Chicago Cubs || 4-11 || Rusch (3-7) || Davis (5-6) || || 41,528 || 44-46
|- bgcolor="ffbbbb"
| 91 || July 14 || @ Arizona Diamondbacks || 3-4 || Medders (3-2) || Turnbow (4-5) || || 24,117 || 44-47
|- bgcolor="ffbbbb"
| 92 || July 15 || @ Arizona Diamondbacks || 1-8 || Webb (10-3) || Capuano (10-5) || || 26,318 || 44-48
|- bgcolor="bbffbb"
| 93 || July 16 || @ Arizona Diamondbacks || 10-5 || Bush (6-7) || Vargas (7-6) || || 29,308 || 45-48
|- bgcolor="bbffbb"
| 94 || July 17 || @ San Francisco Giants || 10-1 || Jackson (2-2) || Schmidt (6-6) || || 36,738 || 46-48
|- bgcolor="ffbbbb"
| 95 || July 18 || @ San Francisco Giants || 3-4 || Wright (6-8) || González (2-1) || Benítez (12) || 37,054 || 46-49
|- bgcolor="ffbbbb"
| 96 || July 19 || @ San Francisco Giants || 6-7 || Wilson (1-2) || Turnbow (4-6) || || 39,570 || 46-50
|- bgcolor="ffbbbb"
| 97 || July 21 || @ Cincinnati Reds || 5-6 || Majewski (4-3) || Turnbow (4-7) || || 19,677 || 46-51
|- bgcolor="ffbbbb"
| 98 || July 22 || @ Cincinnati Reds || 7-8 || Coffey (6-4) || González (2-2) || Guardado (10) || 41,915 || 46-52
|- bgcolor="bbffbb"
| 99 || July 23 || @ Cincinnati Reds || 4-1 || Ohka (3-1) || Milton (6-6) || Kolb (1) || 22,726 || 47-52
|- bgcolor="bbffbb"
| 100 || July 24 || Pittsburgh Pirates || 12-8 || Davis (6-6) || Duke (7-9) || || 30,252 || 48-52
|- bgcolor="ffbbbb"
| 101 || July 25 || Pittsburgh Pirates || 1-6 || Snell (9-6) || Bush (6-8) || || 35,923 || 48-53
|- bgcolor="ffbbbb"
| 102 || July 26 || Pittsburgh Pirates || 4-8 || Maholm (4-9) || Capuano (10-6) || || 37,678 || 48-54
|- bgcolor="ffbbbb"
| 103 || July 28 || Cincinnati Reds || 3-4 || Milton (7-6) || Wise (5-5) || Guardado (11) || 32,743 || 48-55
|- bgcolor="bbffbb"
| 104 || July 29 || Cincinnati Reds || 6-3 || González (3-2) || Germano (0-1) || Turnbow (24) || 43,000 || 49-55
|- bgcolor="bbffbb"
| 105 || July 30 || Cincinnati Reds || 4-3 || Sheets (2-3) || Harang (11-7) || Cordero (7) || 42,976 || 50-55
|- bgcolor="ffbbbb"
| 106 || July 31 || @ Colorado Rockies || 2-4 || Cook (7-9) || Capuano (10-7) || Fuentes (20) || 23,189 || 50-56

|- bgcolor="bbffbb"
| 107 || August 1 || @ Colorado Rockies || 1-0 || Bush (7-8) || Fogg (7-6) || Cordero (8) || 22,082 || 51-56
|- bgcolor="ffbbbb"
| 108 || August 2 || @ Colorado Rockies || 2-8 || Kim (7-6) || Ohka (3-2) || || 24,034 || 51-57
|- bgcolor="bbffbb"
| 109 || August 4 || @ St. Louis Cardinals || 4-3 || Davis (7-6) || Carpenter (10-6) || Cordero (9) || 43,162 || 52-57
|- bgcolor="ffbbbb"
| 110 || August 5 || @ St. Louis Cardinals || 3-4 || Reyes (3-5) || Sheets (2-4) || Isringhausen (29) || 43,299 || 52-58
|- bgcolor="ffbbbb"
| 111 || August 6 || @ St. Louis Cardinals || 1-7 || Suppan (9-6) || Capuano (10-8) || Sosa (4) || 43,140 || 52-59
|- bgcolor="ffbbbb"
| 112 || August 8 || Chicago Cubs || 3-6 || Mármol (5-5) || Ohka (3-3) || Dempster (22) || 36,200 || 52-60
|- bgcolor="bbffbb"
| 113 || August 9 || Chicago Cubs || 6-3 || Bush (8-8) || Zambrano (12-5) || Cordero (10) || 36,012 || 53-60
|- bgcolor="bbffbb"
| 114 || August 10 || Chicago Cubs || 8-6 || Davis (8-6) || Prior (1-6) || Cordero (11) || 41,686 || 54-60
|- bgcolor="ffbbbb"
| 115 || August 11 || @ Atlanta Braves || 1-2 || Smoltz (10-5) || Turnbow (4-8) || || 31,336 || 54-61
|- bgcolor="bbffbb"
| 116 || August 12 || @ Atlanta Braves || 8-5 || Sheets (3-4) || Barry (0-1) || Cordero (12) || 40,480 || 55-61
|- bgcolor="ffbbbb"
| 117 || August 13 || @ Atlanta Braves || 4-7 || Paronto (1-0) || Wise (5-6) || Wickman (22) || 34,718 || 55-62
|- bgcolor="ffbbbb"
| 118 || August 14 || @ Pittsburgh Pirates || 2-4 || Santos (5-7) || Bush (8-9) || Gonzalez (21) || 16,279 || 55-63
|- bgcolor="bbffbb"
| 119 || August 15 || @ Pittsburgh Pirates || 6-3 || Davis (9-6) || Marte (0-6) || Cordero (13) || 17,877 || 56-63
|- bgcolor="bbffbb"
| 120 || August 16 || @ Pittsburgh Pirates || 5-2  || González (4-2) || Marte (0-7) || Cordero (14) || 14,901 || 57-63
|- bgcolor="ffbbbb"
| 121 || August 17 || Houston Astros || 3-7 || Hirsh (1-1) || Sheets (3-5) || || 30,252 || 57-64
|- bgcolor="bbffbb"
| 122 || August 18 || Houston Astros || 3-2 || Cordero (8-4) || Lidge (0-4) || || 30,294 || 58-64
|- bgcolor="bbffbb"
| 123 || August 19 || Houston Astros || 6-4 || Bush (9-9) || Rodríguez (9-7) || Cordero (15) || 42,347 || 59-64
|- bgcolor="ffbbbb"
| 124 || August 20 || Houston Astros || 1-3 || Clemens (5-4) || Davis (9-7) || Wheeler (4) || 41,222 || 59-65
|- bgcolor="bbffbb"
| 125 || August 22 || Colorado Rockies || 4-1 || Capuano (11-8) || Cook (8-12) || Cordero (16) || 25,158 || 60-65
|- bgcolor="bbffbb"
| 126 || August 23 || Colorado Rockies || 7-1 || Sheets (4-5) || Kim (7-9) || || 35,569 || 61-65
|- bgcolor="bbffbb"
| 127 || August 24 || Colorado Rockies || 12-6 || Ohka || Fogg (9-8) || || 35,484 || 62-65
|- bgcolor="ffbbbb"
| 128 || August 25 || @ Florida Marlins || 5-6 || Moehler (7-8) || Bush (9-10) || Borowski (30) || 13,447 || 62-66
|- bgcolor="ffbbbb"
| 129 || August 26 || @ Florida Marlins || 2-7 || Willis (9-10) || Davis (9-8) || || 30,017 || 62-67
|- bgcolor="ffbbbb"
| 130 || August 27 || @ Florida Marlins || 3-4 || Borowski (2-2) || Shouse (1-1) || || 13,544 || 62-68
|- bgcolor="ffbbbb"
| 131 || August 28 || @ Florida Marlins || 2-4 || Johnson (12-6) || Sheets (4-6) || Borowski (31) || 10,226 || 62-69
|- bgcolor="ffbbbb"
| 132 || August 29 || @ Florida Marlins || 3-10 || Qualls (5-3) || Shouse (1-2) || || 32,981 || 62-70
|- bgcolor="ffbbbb"
| 133 || August 30 || @ Houston Astros || 0-1 || Lidge (1-4) || Capellan (2-1) || || 35,021 || 62-71
|- bgcolor="ffbbbb"
| 134 || August 31 || @ Houston Astros || 3-5 || Pettitte (13-13) || Davis (9-9) || Lidge (28) || 36,438 || 62-72

|- bgcolor="ffbbbb"
| 135 || September 1 || Florida Marlins || 2-3 || Sánchez (6-2) || Capuano (11-9) || Borowski (32) || 33,334 || 62-73
|- bgcolor="ffbbbb"
| 136 || September 2 || Florida Marlins || 6-9 || Borowski (3-2) || Turnbow (4-9) || Tankersley (3) || 44,005 || 62-74
|- bgcolor="ffbbbb"
| 137 || September 3 || Florida Marlins || 3-10 || Olsen (12-7) || Ohka (4-4) || || 25,058 || 62-75
|- bgcolor="bbffbb"
| 138 || September 4 || Los Angeles Dodgers || 3-6 || Bush (10-10) || Maddux (12-12) || Cordero (17) || 33,645 || 63-75
|- bgcolor="bbffbb"
| 139 || September 5 || Los Angeles Dodgers || 9-0 || Davis (10-9) || Hendrickson (5-15) || || 13,427 || 64-75
|- bgcolor="ffbbbb"
| 140 || September 6 || Los Angeles Dodgers || 1-2 || Lowe (14-8) || Capuano (11-10) || Saito (18) || 25,106 || 64-76
|- bgcolor="ffbbbb"
| 141 || September 8 || Houston Astros || 3-4 || Oswalt (12-8) || Capellan (2-2) || Lidge (31) || 19,677 || 64-77
|- bgcolor="ffbbbb"
| 142 || September 9 || Houston Astros || 4-10 || Hirsh (3-3) || Ohka (4-5) || || 31,216 || 64-78
|- bgcolor="bbffbb"
| 143 || September 10 || Houston Astros || 4-0 || Bush (11-10) || Rodríguez (9-9) || || 23,456 || 65-78
|- bgcolor="ffbbbb"
| 144 || September 11 || @ Pittsburgh Pirates || 3-4 || Duke (9-13) || Davis (10-10) || Torres (6) || 13,643 || 65-79
|- bgcolor="bbbbbb"
| || September 12 || @ Pittsburgh Pirates || colspan=6 |Postponed (rain) 
|- bgcolor="ffbbbb"
| 145 || September 13 || @ Pittsburgh Pirates || 3-6 || Snell (13-10) || Capuano (11-11) || Torres (7) || ? || 65-80
|- bgcolor="bbffbb"
| 146 || September 13 || @ Pittsburgh Pirates || 2-1 || Sheets (5-6) || Chacón (6-6) || Cordero (18) || 11,627 || 66-80
|- bgcolor="bbffbb"
| 147 || September 15 || @ Washington Nationals || 5-2 || Villanueva (1-1) || Ortiz (10-14) || Cordero (19) || 21,168 || 67-80
|- bgcolor="ffbbbb"
| 148 || September 16 || @ Washington Nationals || 5-8 || Astacio (4-5) || Bush (11-11) || Cordero (27) || 24,252 || 67-81
|- bgcolor="ffbbbb"
| 149 || September 17 || @ Washington Nationals || 1-6 || Rivera (3-0) || Davis (10-11) || || 26,128 || 67-82
|- bgcolor="bbffbb"
| 150 || September 18 || St. Louis Cardinals || 4-3 || Cordero (9-4) || Looper (9-2) || || 19,360 || 68-82
|- bgcolor="ffbbbb"
| 151 || September 19 || St. Louis Cardinals || 2-12 || Weaver (7-14) || Sheets (5-7) || || 15,204 || 68-83
|- bgcolor="bbffbb"
| 152 || September 20 || St. Louis Cardinals || 1-0 || Cordero (10-4) || Johnson (0-3) || || 14,242 || 69-83
|- bgcolor="bbffbb"
| 153 || September 21 || San Francisco Giants || 9-4 || Bush (12-11) || Morris (10-15) || || 28,719 || 70-83
|- bgcolor="bbffbb"
| 154 || September 22 || San Francisco Giants || 13-12 || Capellan (3-2) || Chulk (1-3) || Cordero (20) || 21,796 || 71-83
|- bgcolor="bbffbb"
| 155 || September 23 || San Francisco Giants || 10-8 || Capellan (4-2) || Taschner (0-1) || Cordero (21) || 33,989 || 72-83
|- bgcolor="bbffbb"
| 156 || September 24 || San Francisco Giants || 5-3 || Sheets (6-7) || Cain (13-11) || Cordero (22) || 23,049 || 73-83
|- bgcolor="ffbbbb"
| 157 || September 26 || @ Chicago Cubs || 6-14 || Marshall (6-9) || Villanueva (1-2) || || 31,932 || 73-84
|- bgcolor="ffbbbb"
| 158 || September 27 || @ Chicago Cubs || 2-3 || Howry (4-5) || Cordero (10-5) || || 36,273 || 73-85
|- bgcolor="bbffbb"
| 159 || September 28 || @ St. Louis Cardinals || 9-4 || Davis (11-11) || Marquis (14-16) || || 40,313 || 74-85
|- bgcolor="ffbbbb"
| 160 || September 29 || @ St. Louis Cardinals || 5-10 || Weaver (8-14) || Capuano (11-12) || || 41,718 || 74-86
|- bgcolor="ffbbbb"
| 161 || September 30 || @ St. Louis Cardinals || 2-3 || Johnson (2-4) || Shouse (1-3) || Wainwright (3) || 44,294 || 74-87

|- bgcolor="bbffbb"
| 162 || October 1 || @ St. Louis Cardinals || 5-3 || Villanueva (2-2) || Reyes (5-8) || || 44,133 || 75-87

Player stats

Batting

Starters by position 
Note: Pos = Position; G = Games played; AB = At bats; H = Hits; Avg. = Batting average; HR = Home runs; RBI = Runs batted in

Other batters 
Note: G = Games played; AB = At bats; H = Hits; Avg. = Batting average; HR = Home runs; RBI = Runs batted in

Pitching

Starting pitchers 
Note: G = Games pitched; IP = Innings pitched; W = Wins; L = Losses; ERA = Earned run average; SO = Strikeouts

Other pitchers 
Note: G = Games pitched; IP = Innings pitched; W = Wins; L = Losses; ERA = Earned run average; SO = Strikeouts

Relief pitchers 
Note: G = Games pitched; W = Wins; L = Losses; SV = Saves; ERA = Earned run average; SO = Strikeouts

Farm system

The Brewers' farm system consisted of six minor league affiliates in 2006.

References

2006 Milwaukee Brewers team at Baseball-Reference
2006 Milwaukee Brewers team page at www.baseball-almanac.com

Milwaukee Brewers seasons
Milwaukee Brewers
Milwaukee Brewers